The Papists Act 1716 (3 Geo. I, c. 18) was an Act of the Parliament of Great Britain. The Act enabled two justices of the peace to tender the oaths of allegiance and supremacy and the oath of abjuration of the Pretender to any Roman Catholic whom they felt was disaffected. Their refusal to take the oath would make them liable to the punishments of recusancy. Also, Catholic landowners were required to register their estates with all future conveyances and wills.

Notes

Great Britain Acts of Parliament 1716
History of Christianity in the United Kingdom
1716 in Christianity
Law about religion in the United Kingdom